The following lists events that happened during 1982 in Botswana.

Incumbents
 President: Quett Masire
 Vice President: Lenyeletse Seretse

Events
 Botswana National Museum hosts Culture & Resistance Conference, 5-9 July 1982.

Births

June
 June 17 - Kgakgamotso Pharo, Batswana football player

September
 September 16 - Keoagetse Radipotsane, Batswana football player

References

 
Years of the 20th century in Botswana
1980s in Botswana
Botswana
Botswana